Henrik Evensen (born 17 November 1994 in Maura) is a Norwegian cyclist, who last rode for UCI Continental team .

Major results
2016
 7th Slag om Norg
 9th Paris–Roubaix Espoirs
2017
 9th Grote Prijs Marcel Kint
2018
 1st  Overall Ronde de l'Oise
1st  Points classification
1st Stages 1 & 4

References

External links

1994 births
Living people
Norwegian male cyclists